Širvintos is a city in Vilnius County in the eastern part of Lithuania. It is the administrative center of the Širvintos district municipality.

The word Širvintos is the plural form of the name of the Širvinta River, which flows through the city.

Its alternate names include Shirvintay, Shirvintos, Širvintai, Širvintar, Širvintų, and Szyrwinty (Polish).

History 
Before World War II, the town had an important Jewish community representing one-third of the total population. In September 1941, Jews of the town are murdered in mass executions perpetrated by Germans and Lithuanian collaborators.

Since 2010, the city started expanding and renovated the city center which improved its image and popularity.

References

Cities in Vilnius County
Cities in Lithuania
Municipalities administrative centres of Lithuania
Širvintos District Municipality
Vilnius Voivodeship
Vilensky Uyezd